Metro Pacific Investments Corporation (MPIC) is a Philippine-based unit investment holding company of First Pacific Company Limited through Metro Pacific Holdings, Inc. MPIC through its subsidiaries, provides water, sanitation, and sewerage services and also operates in real estate, and infrastructure projects. It also invests in some hospitals in the Philippines.

In May 2016, GT Capital Holdings Inc. acquired 15.6 percent of MPIC, which will, in turn, buy control over GT Capital’s Global Business Power Corporation in a deal worth PHP 29.89 billion. GT Capital acquired 3.6 billion new common shares in MPIC at PHP 6.10 per share amounting to a stake of 11.4 percent on an expanded capital base for a total cash consideration of PHP 21.96 billion. It also acquired a further 1.3 billion common shares in MPIC from Metro Pacific Holdings, Inc. (MPHI), a Philippine affiliate of First Pacific Company, at the same price, for a total of PHP 7.93 billion in cash. These transactions result in GT Capital holding an overall stake of 15.6 percent of the common share capital of MPIC in a new business alliance between the two business groups.

Subsidiaries
Utilities
 Manila Electric Company (Meralco) - holds 10.5% direct stake
 Radius Telecoms, Inc. - 100% owned
 Global Business Power (GBP)
 Metpower Venture Partners
 Maynilad Water Holding Company Inc. - owns 83.96% controlling stake of Maynilad Water Services
 Metropac Water Investments Corporation
 Manila Water Consortium Inc.
 Cebu Manila Water Development Inc.
 Tuan Loc Water Resources Investment Joint Stock Company (Vietnam) - 49%

Power and transport
 Metro Pacific Tollways Corporation
 NLEX Corporation - holds the concession rights to construct, operate and maintain the North Luzon Expressway (NLEX) and the Subic–Clark–Tarlac Expressway (SCTEX). 
 Ho Chi Minh City Infrastructure Investment Joint Stock Company (Vietnam)
 Don Muang Tollway Public Company Ltd. (Thailand)
 Cavitex Infrastructure Corporation (CIC) - holds the concession rights for the operation and maintenance of the Manila–Cavite Expressway (CAVITEX).
 Beacon Electric Asset Holdings Inc. - holds 35% stake in Meralco
 Light Rail Manila Corporation - a joint venture railway company with Ayala Corporation that operates the Manila Line 1 under a 32-year concession agreement with the Light Rail Transit Authority

Logistics
 Metropac Movers, Inc. (MMI) -  is the logistics arm and a subsidiary of infrastructure conglomerate, Metro Pacific Investments Corporation.

Healthcare
 Metro Pacific Hospital Holdings, Inc. (MPHHI) - holds 43.1% stake and management control
 Luzon
 Our Lady of Lourdes Hospital, Manila (20-year lease through EMHMC)
 Asian Hospital and Medical Center (86% Stake), Muntinlupa
 Cardinal Santos Medical Center, San Juan (100% stake) (through CVHMC)
 Makati Medical Center (33% stake), Makati
 Sacred Heart Hospital of Malolos (51% stake), Malolos City, Bulacan
 Manila Doctors Hospital (20% stake), Manila
 Marikina Valley Medical Center (93% stake)
 De Los Santos Medical Center (51% stake), Quezon City
 Delgado Memorial Hospital (65% stake), Quezon City
 Central Luzon Doctors Hospital, Tarlac City
 Visayas
 The Riverside Medical Center Inc., Bacolod
 Ramiro Community Hospital, Tagbilaran
 Mindanao
 Davao Doctors Hospital (34% stake)
 West Metro Medical Center, Zamboanga City
 St. Elizabeth Hospital, General Santos City (80% stake)
 Manuel J. Santos Hospital, Butuan
 East Manila Hospital Managers Corporation (EMHMC) operates Our Lady Of Lourdes Hospital
 Colinas Verdes Hospital Managers Corporation (CVHMC) operates Cardinal Santos Medical Center
 In July 2021, MPIC launched its first high-performance mobile app, called mWell PH.

Food and Beverage
 The Laguna Creamery Inc. (51% stake)

Real Estate
 Landco Pacific - Real Estate arm of MPIC.

Schools
 Davao Doctors College, Davao City
 Riverside College (Philippines), Bacolod City

Others
 IdeaSpace Foundation

References

External links
 Metro Pacific Inverstments Corporation - Official website

Financial services companies of the Philippines
Holding companies of the Philippines
Companies based in Makati
Companies listed on the Philippine Stock Exchange
Conglomerate companies of the Philippines